The Rainbow Herbicides are a group of tactical-use chemicals used by the United States military in Southeast Asia during the Vietnam War. Success with Project AGILE field tests with herbicides in South Vietnam in 1961 and inspiration by the British use of herbicides and defoliants during the Malayan Emergency in the 1950s led to the formal herbicidal program Trail Dust (see Operation Ranch Hand). Herbicidal warfare is the use of substances primarily designed to destroy the plant-based ecosystem of an agricultural food production and/or to destroy foliage which provides the enemy cover.

Background 

The United States discovered 2,4-dichlorophenoxyacetic acid (2,4-D) during World War II. It was recognized as toxic and was combined with large amounts of water or oil to function as a weed-killer. Army experiments with the chemical eventually led to the discovery that 2,4-D combined with 2,4,5-trichlorophenoxyacetic acid (2,4,5-T) yielded a more potent herbicide.  It was found that 2,4,5-T was contaminated with 2,3,7,8-tetrachlorodibenzodioxin (TCDD), commonly called "dioxin".  Researcher Alvin Lee Young found that samples of 2,4,5-T in Agents Pink and Green had doubled the TCDD concentration of Agents Purple or Orange.

Types 

Of the agents used in southeast Asia, their active ingredients and years used were as follows:

Use 
In Vietnam, the early large-scale defoliation missions (1962-1964) used 8,208 gallons of Agent Green, 122,792 gallons of Pink, and 145,000 of Purple. These were dwarfed by the 11,712,860 gallons of Orange (both versions) used from 1965 to 1970. Agent White started to replace Orange in 1966; 5,239,853 gallons of White were used. The only agent used on a large scale in an anti-crop role was Blue, with 2,166,656 gallons used. The bombardment occurred most heavily in the area of the Ho Chi Minh Trail.

The rainbow herbicides damaged the ecosystems and cultivated lands of Vietnam, and led to buildup of dioxins in the regional food chain. About 4.8 million people were affected.

In addition to testing and using the herbicides in Vietnam, Laos and Cambodia, the US military also tested the "Rainbow Herbicides" and many other chemical defoliants and herbicides in the US, Canada, Puerto Rico, Korea, India, and Thailand from the mid-1940s to the late 1960s. Herbicide persistence studies of Agents Orange and White were conducted in the Philippines. The Philippine herbicide test program was conducted in cooperation with the University of the Philippines College of Forestry, and was also described in a 1969 issue of The Philippine Collegian, the college's newspaper. Super or enhanced Agent Orange was tested by representatives from Fort Detrick and Dow Chemical in Texas, Puerto Rico, Hawaii, and later in Malaysia, in a cooperative project with the International Rubber Research Institute. Picloram in Agent White and Super-Orange was contaminated by hexachlorobenzene (HCB) a dioxin-like carcinogen. The Canadian government also tested these herbicides and used them to clear vegetation for artillery training.

Long-term effects 
Vietnam remains heavily contaminated by dioxin-like compounds, which are classified as persistent organic pollutants. These compounds remain in the water table and have built up in the tissues of local fauna. However, the contamination has begun to deteriorate, and the forest canopy has regrown somewhat since the Vietnam War.

Dioxins are endocrine disruptors and may have effects on the children of people who were exposed.
 
Rainbow herbicides and other dioxin-like compounds are endocrine disruptors, and evidence suggests that they continue to have long-term health consequences many years after exposure. Because they mimic, or interfere with, hormonal function, adverse effects can include problems with reproduction, growth and development, immune function, and metabolic function.  As an example, dioxins and dioxin-like compounds influence the hormone dehydoepiandosterone (DHEA), which has a role in the determination of male or female sex characteristics. There have been thousands of documented instances of health problems and birth defects associated with rainbow herbicide exposure in Vietnam, where tested levels remain high in the soil, water, and atmosphere, decades after initial exposure.

Soldiers exposed to Rainbow Herbicides in Southeast Asia reported long-term health effects, which led to several lawsuits against the U.S. government and the manufacturers of the chemical.

See also 
 List of Rainbow Codes
 Operation Ranch Hand
 U.S. Army Biological Warfare Laboratories
 Dow Chemical Company

References

Further reading 
 . A more abbreviated version: 
 "Update #1 to INFORMATION PAPER Agent Orange/Agent Purple and Canadian Forces Base Gagetown" Department of Defense, Veterans and Emergency Management; Maine Veterans’ Services. February 9, 2006. 
 Herbicidal Warfare Vietnam 1961-1971. oneofmanyfeathers.com 2/1/2014.

External links
 

Defoliants
Military equipment of the Vietnam War